Eduardo Alejandro López (born 16 June 1989), better known as Alejandro López, is an Argentine footballer who plays as a left back.

Career

Youth career and debut
Alejandro start his career in his city club Rivadavia de Lincoln, when played in the youth categories since 2003 to 2007. In the following season, he played in the first team of the club, where it remained until 2010, playing 23 matches and marking 3 goals.

O'Higgins

In 2011, Alejandro comes to trial to the Chilean club O'Higgins, and after the tests, he start to play in the first team of the club, making his debut in Primera División against Unión San Felipe, when entered in the minute 62 replacing Mauricio Arias.

In 2012, Alejandro play in the first team and was considered in the starting line-up, as left back. On Juny 28, 2012, he scored the second goal in the first final of the Torneo de Apertura 2012 in the 72 minutes. Finally, in the second final O'Higgins lose the final against Universidad de Chile in penalties.

In 2013, he won the 2013–14 Apertura with O'Higgins, being the first title in the history of the club. In the tournament, he played in 15 of 18 matches, being an important part of the Berizzo's team in the back with Julio Barroso, Yerson Opazo and Mariano Uglessich.

He participated with the club in the 2014 Copa Libertadores where they faced Deportivo Cali, Cerro Porteño and Lanús, being third and being eliminated in the group stage. In the tournament, López scored a free kick goal against Cerro Porteño.

In March 2014, he was affected from the first-team because indiscipline with his teammate Fernando Gutiérrez, losing it the rest of the 2014 Copa Libertadores and the 2014 Supercopa de Chile.

Cobresal

In June 2015, López was released from O'Higgins and was signed to the 2015–16 season by the current Campeonato Nacional Champions Cobresal. He returned to Cobresal on second half 2017 to play in the 2017 Primera B.

Return to Argentina
After playing for Cobresal in 2017, López returned to his hometown club, Rivadavia de Lincoln, and next has mainly played for amateur clubs. Since 2019 he has played for Juventud Unida from Santa Isabel (Liga Venadense), Defensores Unidos from Zárate (Primera B Metropolitana), Mariano Moreno from Junín (Regional Amateur) and Deportivo Tres Algarrobos (Liga del Oeste).

Career statistics

Club

Honours

Club
O'Higgins
Primera División: 2013–14 Apertura

Individual
O'Higgins
Medalla Santa Cruz de Triana: 2014

References

External links
 López at Football Lineups
 
 

1989 births
Living people
People from Lincoln Partido
Argentine footballers
Argentine expatriate footballers
Rivadavia de Lincoln footballers
Club Atlético Tigre footballers
O'Higgins F.C. footballers
Cobresal footballers
San Martín de Tucumán footballers
Torneo Argentino C players
Torneo Argentino A players
Torneo Federal A players
Chilean Primera División players
Primera Nacional players
Primera B de Chile players
Primera B Metropolitana players
Expatriate footballers in Chile
Argentine expatriate sportspeople in Chile
Association football defenders
Sportspeople from Buenos Aires Province